Gabriel Höfner ( 16 May 1842, Türnitz, Niederösterreich- 4 March 1921, Wolfsberg, Carinthia) was an Austrian entomologist, musician and composer.

Entomology

Gabriel Höfner specialised in Lepidoptera notably Carinthia, Lavanttal, Koralpe and the Saualpe He described Micropterix aureoviridella (Höfner, 1898), Dichagyris nigrescens (Höfner, 1887), Montanima karavankensis (Höfner, 1888), Elachista albicapilla Höfner, 1918 and Elachista argentifasciella Höfner, 1898.

Höfner undertook studies on Erebia and Psychidae, among others in over 40 publications (1876–1900) on Lepidoptera. He was past master of the Lepidoptera of Carinthia recording over 1.600 species.

References
J. T. 1921: [Höfner, G.] Entomologische Zeitschrift, Frankfurt a. M 35 (9)
Nachruf von Dr. Zweigelt, Klosterneuburg in der Zeitschrift des Österreichischen Entomologen-Vereines, 6. Jahrgang, Nr. 6 vom 1. Juni 1921 auf landesmuseum.at includes bibliography
Zobodat

1921 deaths
1842 births
Austrian lepidopterists